Reyhanlı Belediyespor is a football club located in Hatay, Turkey. The team competes in Turkish Regional Amateur League.

League participations 
TFF Second League: 1986–1987,
TFF Third League: 1984–1986, 1987–1992
Turkish Regional Amateur League: 2013–2015
Hatay Amateur Leagues: 1992–2013, 2015–present

League performances 

Source: TFF: Reyhanli Belediyespor

Current squad

References

External links 
Reyhanlı Belediyespor on TFF.org

Football clubs in Hatay